Senator Michel may refer to:

Geoff Michel (born 1963), Minnesota State Senate
J. Walter Michel (born 1960), Mississippi State Senate

See also
Senator Mitchell (disambiguation)